Andagala is a village in Galewela Town. It is located Andagala - Polgahangoda road within Matale District, Central Province, Sri Lanka

See also
List of towns in Central Province, Sri Lanka

External links

Populated places in Matale District